Who Sent You? is the second record by free jazz collective Irreversible Entanglements. It was released through Don Giovanni Records and International Anthem Recording Company in March 2020.

Composition
On Who Sent You?, the quintet craft a fusion of "tight, synergistic" free jazz with "dynamic" spoken word.

Critical reception

Upon its release, Who Sent You? was welcomed with critical applause. On Metacritic, it has a score of 87 out of 100, indicating "universal acclaim", based on four reviews.

Year-end lists

Track listing
Words composed by Camae Ayewa. Music composed by Keir Neuringer, Aquiles Navarro, Luke Stewart and Tcheser Holmes, except where noted.

Personnel
Credits adapted from Bandcamp.

Irreversible Entanglements
 Camae Ayewa - voice, texts 
 Keir Neuringer - saxophone, percussion
 Aquiles Navarro - trumpet, percussion
 Luke Stewart - double bass, percussion
 Tcheser Holmes - drums, congas

Technical
 Irreversible Entanglements - production
 Zach Goldstein - engineering
 David Allen - mixing at Decade Studios, Chicago
 Greg Obis - mastering at Chicago Mastering Service

References

 2020 albums
 Don Giovanni Records albums
International Anthem Recording Company albums
 Free jazz albums